Lake North Pole, also known as The North Pool, is a small, shallow pond near the North Pole, and is currently the northernmost pond in the world. It came into existence in 2002, occurring each year, then freezing over in the winter.

The pond, which is approximately one foot deep, is composed almost entirely of fresh water melted from the ice beneath.

A web camera is stationed beside the pond to monitor changes. It was built by the Polar Science Center.

On July 26, 2013, the depth was estimated to be approximately 40 cm.

Members of the scientific community are not alarmed by such bodies of water, stating that they occur widely, and often refer to them as "melt ponds".

See also
 List of northernmost items

References

External links
 January 21, 2013 Executive Summary of the National Oceanic and Atmospheric Administration's Arctic Report Card discussing melting ice.
 Webcam and images at the North Pole Environmental Observatory website

Geography of the Arctic
Extreme points of Earth